South Africa competed in the  2017 Summer Deaflympics for the 7th consecutive time in the Summer Deaflympics since making its debut in 1993. 

South Africa sent a delegation of just 4 participants in the Games including 3 swimmers and an athlete. South African team received 2 silver medals in the competition. Cornell Loubser was the only medalist for South Africa during the event bagging 2 silver medals.

Participants

Medalists

Medal table

References

External links 
 Deaflympics

South Africa at the Deaflympics
2017 in South African sport
Nations at the 2017 Summer Deaflympics